Kiratha Arjuna (also known as Oorvasi Saahasam) is a 1940 Indian Tamil-language Hindu mythological film directed by G. Rameshwaran and Murugadasa, and produced by Venus Pictures. Based on the war between the Pandava prince Arjuna and the god Shiva, the film stars M. R. Krishnamurthi, Thirukharaivaasal Subbulakshmi, Bhavani K. Sambamurthi and T. M. Ramasami Pillai. It was released on 25 May 1940. No print of the film is known to survive, making it a lost film.

Cast 
 M. R. Krishnamurthi as Arjuna
 Thirukharaivaasal Subbulakshmi as Urvashi
 Bhavani K. Sambamurthi as Narada
 T. M. Ramasami Pillai as Shiva

Production 
Kiratha Arjuna had an alternate title: Oorvasi Saahasam. It was directed by G. Rameshwaran and Murugadasa, and produced by Venus Pictures. Bhavani K. Sambamurthi, who portrayed Narada, also composed the film's music, while Papanasam Sivan wrote the lyrics. Cinematography was handled by G. Singh and Devji.

Release and reception 
The film was censored in 1939, but released only on 25 May 1940. No print of the film is known to survive, making it a lost film.

Notes

References

External links 
 

Hindu mythological films
1940s Tamil-language films